Afrowatsonius marginalis is a species of moth of the  family Erebidae. It is found in the Republic of Congo, the Democratic Republic of Congo, Ghana, Guinea, Ivory Coast, Malawi, Nigeria, Senegal, Sierra Leone and Togo.

References

 Natural History Museum Lepidoptera generic names catalog

Spilosomina
Moths described in 1855
Moths of Africa